KTLE-LD (channel 20) is a low-power television station licensed to Odessa, Texas, United States, affiliated with the Spanish-language network Telemundo. It is owned by Gray Television alongside CBS affiliate KOSA-TV (channel 7), MyNetworkTV affiliate KWWT (channel 30), Big Spring–licensed CW+ affiliate KCWO-TV (channel 4), and Midland-licensed low-power Antenna TV affiliate KMDF-LD (channel 22). The five stations share studios inside the Music City Mall on East 42nd Street in Odessa, with a secondary studio and news bureau in downtown Midland; KTLE-LD's transmitter is located on US 385 just north of downtown Odessa.

Even though KTLE-LD has a digital signal of its own, the low-power broadcast range only covers the immediate Midland–Odessa area. Therefore, the station is simulcast in 16:9 widescreen standard definition on KOSA-TV's third digital subchannel in order to reach the entire Permian Basin market; this signal can be seen on virtual and VHF channel 7.3 from a transmitter on FM 866 west of Odessa. Until 2014, KTLE's programming was also simulcast on KTLD-LP (channel 49) in Midland.

History
KTLE-LP began as a construction permit granted to Telemundo on August 23, 1989 and was licensed as K60EE, UHF channel 60, on April 19, 1991. KTLD-LP began as a construction permit granted to Brooks Broadcasting Inc. on April 29, 1988. Brooks Broadcasting sold the permit to Ronald J. Gordon in March 1989, who in turn, sold the permit to Telemundo in October 1991. The station was licensed as K49CD, UHF channel 49, on August 14, 1992.

The stations' early days were marked by uncertainty, being transferred several times as Telemundo, their owner, endured financial hardship in the mid-1990s, and at one point went into bankruptcy. In May 2001, Telemundo sold the stations, along with Amarillo station K36DV (later KTMO-LP), to Lawton, Oklahoma-based Drewry Communications, who owned NBC affiliate KWES-TV in the Midland–Odessa market. Both stations received new call letters in January 2002; K60EE became KTLE-LP, and K49CD became KTLD-LP. In April 2004, KTLE moved from channel 60 to channel 20, having been required to abandon their position in the high-700 MHz band (channels 60-69). KTLD's license was canceled by the Federal Communications Commission (FCC) on March 12, 2014.

On August 10, 2015, Raycom Media announced that it would purchase Drewry Communications for $160 million. The deal was completed on December 1, 2015.

Sale to Gray Television
On June 25, 2018, Atlanta-based Gray Television, owner of CBS affiliate KOSA-TV (channel 7), announced it had reached an agreement with Raycom to merge their respective broadcasting assets (consisting of Raycom's 63 existing owned-and/or-operated television stations, including KWES and KWAB, and Gray's 93 television stations) under Gray's corporate umbrella. The cash-and-stock merger transaction valued at $3.6 billion—in which Gray shareholders would acquire preferred stock currently held by Raycom—required divestment of either KOSA or KWES due to FCC ownership regulations prohibiting common ownership of two of the four highest-rated stations in a single market (as well as more than two stations in any market). As part of the deal, KWES was divested, but KTLE-LP was retained, with its digital simulcast moving to a subchannel of Gray's KOSA-TV. The sale was approved on December 20, and was completed on January 2, 2019. Subsequently, KTLE turned off its analog signal and began digital operations.

Programming
KTLE broadcasts programming from Telemundo, but unlike most low-power television stations, it also features Spanish-language local newscasts, produced by KOSA, which air Monday through Friday at 5 p.m., and Monday through Thursday at 10 p.m.

Subchannels
The station's digital signal is multiplexed:

References

External links
 

Low-power television stations in the United States
Telemundo network affiliates
MeTV affiliates
Ion Television affiliates
Antenna TV affiliates
TLE-LD
Television channels and stations established in 1989
1989 establishments in Texas
Spanish-language television stations in Texas
Gray Television